The El Limón River is a river in Zulia in northwestern Venezuela. It flows into the Caribbean Sea. Tributaries include the Socuy River and Guasare River.

See also
List of rivers of Venezuela

References
Rand McNally, The New International Atlas, 1993.

Rivers of Venezuela